China participated in the 2011 Asian Winter Games in Almaty and Astana, Kazakhstan from January 30, 2011, to February 6, 2011.

Medal summary

Biathlon

China will send 13 biathletes.
Men
Chen Haibin
Li Huanjie
Li Zhiguang
Li Zhonghai
Ren Long
Zhang Chengye

Women
Dong Xue
Liu Yuanyuan
Song Chaoqing
Tang Jialin
Wang Chunli
Wang Yue
Xu Yue

Cross country skiing

China will send 8 cross country skiers.
Men
Li Jingdong
Sun Qinghai
Zhou Hu

Women
Li Hongxue
Li Xin
Liu Hongxue
Man Dandan
Tang Jialin

Figure skating

China will send a team of 13 figure skaters, the most of any country.
Men

Women

Pairs

Ice dance

Freestyle skiing

China will send a team of 10 freestyle skiers.
Men
Guo Xiangru
Jia Zongyang
Liu Zhongqing
Ning Suning
Wang Yusen
Zhao Yang

Women
Li Nan
Ning Qin
Yang Yu
Zhang Xin

Ice hockey

China will send both a men's and women's team. The men's team will play in the top division.
Men
The roster consists of 24 athletes.

Top Division 

All times are local (UTC+6).

Women
The roster consists of 17 athletes.

Group A 

All times are local (UTC+6).

Short track speed skating

China will send a team of 11 short track speed skaters.
Men
Gong Qiuwen
Han Jialiang
Liang Wenhao
Liu Xianwei
Song Weilong
Yang Yin

Women
Fan Kexin
Liu Qiuhong
Zhang Hui
Zhao Nannan
Zhou Yang

Ski jumping

China will send a team of 4 ski jumpers.

Li Yang
Sun Jianping
Xing Chenhui
Yang Guang

Ski orienteering

China will send 2 athletes.
Men
Dong Wenqiang

Women
Liu Xiaoting

Speed skating

China will send a team of 16 speed skaters.
Men
Cheng Yue
Gao Xuefeng
Li Bailin
Song Xingyu
Sun Longjiang
Wang Nan
Zhang Yaolin
Zhang Zhongqi

Women
Chang Chao
Fu Chunyan
Ji Jia
Qi Shuai
Wang Beixing
Wang Fei
Wang Jianlu
Yu Jing

References

Nations at the 2011 Asian Winter Games
Asian Winter Games
2011